is a Japanese footballer currently playing as a forward for FC Osaka.

Career
Takeda was loaned out to JFL club, FC Osaka for 2022 season.

In 2023, he was permanently transfer to FC Osaka has been confirmed.

Career statistics

Club
.

Notes

References

External links

1997 births
Living people
People from Katano
Association football people from Osaka Prefecture
Waseda University alumni
Japanese footballers
Association football forwards
J3 League players
Gamba Osaka players
Tokushima Vortis players
AC Nagano Parceiro players
FC Osaka players